Rhos-y-garth is a hamlet in the  community of Llanilar, Ceredigion, Wales, which is 68.7 miles (110.6 km) from Cardiff and 174.7 miles (281.1 km) from London. Rhos-y-garth is represented in the Senedd by Elin Jones (Plaid Cymru) and is part of the Ceredigion constituency in the House of Commons.

References

See also
List of localities in Wales by population

Villages in Ceredigion